Encephalartos cerinus is a species of cycad in Africa.

Description
It is an acaule plant, with an underground stem 30 cm long and 25 cm wide. Occasionally, a small portion of the stem may come out of the ground.

The leaves, from eight to ten, are opaque and flat, 80–120 cm long and bluish or silvery green in color. The leaflets, 15–18 cm long, are arranged on the rachis in the opposite way at an angle of 150-180° and are covered with a thick, waxy layer which, when rubbed, releases a characteristic odor; the margins are whole and equipped with small denticles.

It is a dioecious species, with spindle-shaped male cones, 55–60 cm long and 9–10 cm broad. The female cones have an ovoid shape, are 30–35 cm long and have a diameter of 15–18 cm. Each plant produces only one cone at a time, whose color, for both sexes, varies with maturation from bluish green to yellow.

The seeds, 25–30 mm long, have an oblong shape and are covered with an orange or yellow sarcotesta.

References

External links
 
 

cerinus